The Grand Mufti (also called Chief Mufti, State Mufti and Supreme Mufti) is the head of regional muftis, Islamic jurisconsults, of a state. The office originated in the early modern era in the Ottoman empire and has been later adopted in a number of modern countries.

Muftis are Islamic jurists qualified to issue a nonbinding opinion (fatwa) on a point of Islamic law (sharia). In the 15th century, muftis of the Ottoman empire, who had acted as independent scholars in earlier times, began to be integrated into a hierarchical bureaucracy of religious institutions and scholars. By the end of the 16th century, the government-appointed mufti of Istanbul came to be recognized under the title Shaykh al-Islam (Turkish: şeyhülislam) as the Grand Mufti in charge of this hierarchy. The Ottoman Grand Mufti performed a number of functions, including advising the sultan on religious matters, legitimizing government policies, and appointing judges. After the dissolution the Ottoman Empire the office of the Grand Mufti has been adopted in a number of countries across the Muslim world, often serving the role of providing religious support for government policies. The Grand Mufti is generally an individual appointed by the state, although the office has collective or elective character in some modern countries.

History

Muftis are Muslim religious scholars who issue legal opinions (fatwas) interpreting Sharia (Islamic law). The Ottoman Empire began the practice of giving official recognition and status to a single mufti, above all others, as the Grand Mufti. The Sheikh ul-Islam (or "grand mufti") of Istanbul had, since the late 16th century, come to be regarded as the head of the religious establishment. He was thus not only pre-eminent but bureaucratically responsible for the body of religious-legal scholars and gave legal rulings on important state policies such as the dethronement of rulers. This practice was subsequently borrowed and adapted by Egypt for the head of its Dar al-Ifta (House of Fatwas) from the mid-19th century. From there, the concept spread to other Muslim states, so that today there are approximately 16 countries with sizable Muslim populations which have a Grand Mufti. The relationship between the Grand Mufti of any given state and the state's rulers can vary considerably, both by region and by historical era.

Election

Brunei
The State Mufti of Brunei is nominated by the Sultan.

India
The Grand Mufti of India is elected by the Electoral college and appointed by the Islamic Community of India.

Jerusalem
Throughout the era of British colonialism, the British retained the institution of Grand Mufti in some Muslim areas under their control and accorded the Grand Mufti of Jerusalem the highest political stature in Palestine. During World War I (1914–1918), there were two competing Grand Muftis of Jerusalem, one endorsed by the British and one by the Ottoman Empire. When Palestine was under British rule, the Grand Mufti of Jerusalem was a position appointed by the British Mandate authorities. In the Palestinian National Authority, the administrative organization established to govern parts of the West Bank and Gaza Strip, the Grand Mufti is appointed by the president.

Malaysia
Malaysia has a unique system of collective mufti. Nine of the fourteen Malaysian states have their own constitutional monarchy; nine are ruled by their own constitutional monarch while the country is led by a monarch elected from the nine. These nine monarchs have authority over religious matters within their own states: therefore, each of these nine states have their own mufti who usually controls the Islamic Council or Islamic Department of the state. At the national level, a National Council of Fatwa (Majlis Fatwa Kebangsaan) has been formed under the Department of Islamic Advancement of Malaysia (Jabatan Kemajuan Islam Malaysia or JAKIM). JAKIM appoints five Muftis for the five states which do not have monarchs. The muftis of the nine monarchical states, together with the five officials appointed by JAKIM in the National Council of Fatwā, collectively issue fatāwā at the national level.

Mughal Empire
In the Mughal Empire, the Grand Mufti of India was a state official.

Ottoman Empire
In the Ottoman Empire, the Grand Mufti was a state official, and the Grand Mufti of Constantinople was the highest of these.

Saudi Arabia
The Grand Mufti of Saudi Arabia, with office created in 1953, is appointed by the King.

Tunisia
According to Article 78 of the 2014 Constitution, the Grand Mufti of Tunisia is appointed and can be dismissed by the President of the Republic.

List of Grand Muftis

The list includes the names of currently appointed Grand Muftis who will take office on an appointed date and appointed by a governing committee.

List of former Grand Muftis

See also
Imam
Muftiate
List of Islamic muftiates
Grand Mufti of India

References

 
Islamic religious leaders
Lists of Islamic religious leaders
Muslim scholars of Islamic jurisprudence
Religious leadership roles
Religious titles